Van Poppel is a Dutch toponymic surname, meaning "from Poppel", a village on the Belgian-Dutch border. Notable people with the surname include:

Boy van Poppel (born 1988), Dutch racing cyclist, son of Jean-Paul
Danny van Poppel (born 1993), Dutch racing cyclist, son of Jean-Paul
Jean-Paul van Poppel (born 1962), Dutch racing cyclist
Michael van Poppel (born 1989), Dutch journalist
Todd Van Poppel (born 1971), American baseball player

See also 
 Poppel (disambiguation)
 Brooke Van Poppelen (born 1978), American comedian, actress, and writer

References

Dutch-language surnames
Surnames of Dutch origin
Toponymic surnames